Encounters in the Corelian Quadrant is a 1980 role-playing game supplement for Traveller published by Group One.

Contents
Encounters in the Corelian Quadrant is a book of starship encounters featuring four new types of starships.

Publication history
Encounters in the Corelian Quadrant was published in 1980 by Group One as a 16-page book.

Reception
William A. Barton reviewed Encounters in the Corelian Quadrant in The Space Gamer No. 35. Barton commented that "Encounters in the Corelian Quadrant can't fail to spice up starship encounters in even the most exciting of your Traveller campaigns."

References

Role-playing game supplements introduced in 1980
Traveller (role-playing game) supplements